Cercopeus is a genus of broad-nosed weevils in the beetle family Curculionidae. There are about 17 described species in Cercopeus.

Species
These 17 species belong to the genus Cercopeus:

 Cercopeus alexi O?Brien, Ciegler et Giron, 2010 c g
 Cercopeus bolli Burke, 1963 i g
 Cercopeus chisaius Sleeper, 1955 i g
 Cercopeus chrysorrhoeus (Say, 1831) i c g b
 Cercopeus clispus Sleeper, 1955 i g
 Cercopeus confusor Sleeper, 1955 i g
 Cercopeus cornelli O?Brien, Ciegler et Giron, 2010 c g
 Cercopeus femoratus O?Brien, Ciegler and Giron, 2010 c g
 Cercopeus isquitus Sleeper, 1955 i g
 Cercopeus komareki O'Brien, 1977 i c g b
 Cercopeus maspavancus Sleeper, 1955 i c g
 Cercopeus paulus O?Brien, Ciegler et Giron, 2010 c g
 Cercopeus schwarzi Sleeper, 1955 i g
 Cercopeus simius Sleeper, 1955 i g
 Cercopeus skelleyi O c g b
 Cercopeus strigicollis Sleeper, 1955 i c g
 Cercopeus tibialis O?Brien, Ciegler et Giron, 2010 c g

Data sources: i = ITIS, c = Catalogue of Life, g = GBIF, b = Bugguide.net

References

Further reading

 
 
 
 

Entiminae
Articles created by Qbugbot